Laapata is a 2021 Pakistani drama television series, produced by Momina Duraid under her banner MD Productions and directed by Khizer Idrees. It stars Ayeza Khan, Sarah Khan, Ali Rehman Khan, and Gohar Rasheed in leading roles.

Plot 
Shams and Falak are cousins and love each other. Falak has a hobby of Badminton and Shams has been indulging in gambling in order to get money for the sake of Falak. On the other hand, Geeti, who is a famous TikToker, likes Shams and is also the cousin of Falak and Shams. Falak and Shams consulted their parents for their marriage and they were engaged. But due to Shams's indulgence in gambling, he was put in prison. His housemates, including Falak and Geeti, didn't know where he went. It has been two years and Shams hasn't been found yet. Falak wins in a badminton championship and she also does a job. Her boss Daniyal likes her and is stalking her. He proposed to her several times but she rejected him every time. Finally, when there was no sign of Shams's return, Falak killed her love for Shams and married Daniyal. The couple moved to Islamabad. They were living a happy life until Daniyal finds out about Shams and Falak's relationship through a photo of Shams and Falak. He overreacts and that's when it is revealed that Daniyal is actually a psychopath.

In a party, Falak hears from the wife of Daniyal's friend that Daniyal had another beautiful wife before Falak. She further tells her that according to Daniyal, she divorced him and left. But some rumours say that Daniyal himself killed his own wife as he thought that she was cheating on him. Falak is shocked to hear that. On the other hand, Shams has returned home after two years and learns about Falak's marriage. He is saddened and decides to move on. He finds a job in a factory where he is put in charge of a specific floor. He faced difficulties when one of the workers, Raju, wants to be placed in charge and is very dominating. 
Geeti asks her mother to get her engaged to Shams as now Falak has cleared her path. Her mother initially hesitates but agrees and talks to Shams's parents. They also agreed and Shams and Geeti get engaged.

On the contrary, Falak has been overwhelmed by Daniyal's true character. She fights with Daniyal who in return turns really hyper and breaks Falak's phone. He was on the verge of killing her when their maid Munira hits him with a pan and he faints. Falak was told that she had to trust Munira as she was the one who knew Daniyal's first wife and her murder. The drama goes into a series of flashbacks and it is shown that Daniyal has married Aliya  whose father had captured the lands of Daniyal's father. Daniyal and Aliya marry with the help of Aliya's brother as her father won't let her. They live happily. Daniyal orders Aliya not to meet her relatives until they migrate to America. She accepts. One day Aliya told Munira to return to her home (and she did) and behind her back she invites a man whom Munira has never seen. This happened everyday until one day Munira calls Daniyal and tells him that Aliya has been cheating on him. Daniyal then comes home, catches her, and shoots her on the spot. She instantly dies. It is revealed that the boy was none other than her own brother who helped her in marriage. Her brother told Daniyal that after their marriage, Aliya's father had died and he was here to inherit the lands to Aliya's name. Daniyal is shocked and Aliya's brother calls the police so Daniyal shoots him too. He tells Munira not to tell anyone about their murders. The scene comes to the present and Falak is living in Munira's house. The next morning , Daniyal comes to Munira's house and attacks them and Falak kills Daniyal. Falak is devastated to see that but Munira consoles her. Munira 's husband is not happy with it because he is scared as Falak is in a bad situation and that would land both of them in trouble. Falak overhears them debating about it and she proclaims to Munira that she has helped her a lot, thanks her,  and leaves her house. Meanwhile, Shams and Geeti are engaged. Falak comes just before the engagement and Shams becomes very happy to see her again. But, Geeti doesn't like it. Falak comes with an excuse, that she and Daniyal are going to America, so she is living here for a while and after that she will flee to America. On the day of the wedding, the police come to arrest Falak for murdering Daniyal. The wedding is called off.

Cast  
 Sarah Khan as Falak 
 Ayeza Khan as Geeti 
 Ali Rehman Khan as Shams 
 Gohar Rasheed as Daniyal 
Hamza Majeed Khan in a special appearance 
 Asma Abbas as Samina, Geeti's Mother
 Rabia Noreen as Nighat, Falak's mother
 Khalifa Sajeeruddin as Khursheed, Falak's father
 Amna Malik as Faryal, Falak's sister
 Munazzah Arif as Rukhsana; Shams's mother
 Akbar Islam as Hameed, Shams's father
 Saife Hassan as Inspector Tahir
 Inaya Khan as Nasreen, Geeti's friend
 Kasim Khan as Shahid, Nasreen's husband
 Fahima Awan as Rehana, Sohail's sister and Faryal's sister-in-law
 Raza Ali Abid	as Raju, Shams's former friend
 Qaiser Khan Nizamani as Karim, Daniyal's father
 Amber Khan as Mrs. Karim, Daniyal's mother
 Momina Iqbal as Aliya, Daniyal's former wife (cameo)
 Sarmad Khoosat as television director (cameo)
 Raeed Muhammad Alam as Geeti's imaginary boyfriend (cameo)

Reception

TV ratings 
The 20th episode of the show received 5.3 TV ratings and the last episode ended on 7.5 rating points in the 50-minute time band.

Critical reception 
On its premiere, it received mixed to negative reviews due to the storyline and the usual cliches that are common on television, but was praised for its direction. On the airing of the initial episodes, it received negative comments and reviews from critics and social media users for trivialising harassment. The slap scene in the  14th episode had mixed reviews by social media users, with reviewers criticizing the trivialization of domestic abuse.

Awards and nominations

Soundtrack

The official soundtrack of the serial was performed by Kiran Waseem and Tehseen W. Chishty on the lyrics of Wardah Lodhi. The music composition was done by Farhan Zameer. Beside the official soundtrack, the soundtracks of the channel's former serials such as "Aaj Rang Hai" of Ullu Baraye Farokht Nahi and "Khabar-e-tahayyur-e-ishq sun, na junoon raha na pari rahi" of Deewana were played in the background during the course of the episodes.

Production

Background and development 
After the success of the Ramadan special play Chupke Chupke, Ayeza Khan revealed that she would be starring in another serial alongside Sarah Khan, Ali Rehman Khan, and Gohar Rasheed. Khizar Idrees, who previously served as a cinematographer of the 2017 film Verna and the production house's dramas Sang-e-Mar Mar and Aangan, was chosen to direct the series and also wrote the story of the series.

Production locations 
Besides a few episodes which were shot in Islamabad, the shooting was mostly done in Karachi.

References

Hum TV original programming
Urdu-language television shows
Pakistani drama television series
MD Productions
2021 Pakistani television series debuts
2021 Pakistani television series endings